South Korean singer Taeyeon has embarked on numerous headlining concert tours, three of which toured multiple countries in Asia. The concert, Butterfly Kiss, made Taeyeon the first Korean female artist to embark on a full-scale concert while still being a member of an active girl group. She was the first South Korean female solo artist to hold a solo concert at Hong Kong's AsiaWorld Expo Arena. She also became the first South Korean female soloist to stage back-to-back shows in Thailand.

1st Asia Tour: Taeyeon Solo Concert "Persona" 

Persona was Taeyeon's first Asia concert tour. The first show was held on May 12, 2017, at Olympic Hall in Seoul, South Korea.
Setlist

2nd Asia Tour: 's... Taeyeon Concert 

's... Taeyeon Concert was Taeyeon's second Asia concert tour organised by SM Entertainment and Dream Maker Entertainment Limited.
Set list

Taeyeon Japan Tour 2019 ~Signal~ 

Taeyeon Japan Tour 2019 ~Signal~ was Taeyeon's first Japanese concert tour. The first show was held on April 13, 2019, at Fukuoka Sunpalace. 
Set list

3rd Asia Tour: Taeyeon Concert – The Unseen 

Taeyeon Concert – The Unseen was Taeyeon's third Asia tour (fourth overall) held by Taeyeon. The first show was held on January 17, 2020, at Olympic Handball Gymnasium in Seoul, South Korea. 
Set list

Taeyeon Japan Tour 2020 
{{Infobox concert
| concert_tour_name = Taeyeon Japan Tour 2020
| image             =
| image_size        = 
| border            = 
| image_caption     = 
| artist            = Taeyeon
| type              = 
| album             = 
| start_date        = 
| end_date          = 
| number_of_legs    = 
| number_of_shows   = 
| gross             = 
| URL               = 
| last_tour         = ''3rd Asia Tour: Taeyeon Concert – The Unseen(2020)
| this_tour         = Taeyeon Japan Tour 2020
| next_tour         = 
}}

Concerts
The Agit – Taeyeon's Very Special DayTaeyeon's Very Special Day''' is the first concert series by Taeyeon, which was held from October 23 to October 25, 2015, and later from October 29 to November 1, 2015.
{{hidden
| headercss = background: #ccccff; font-size: 100%; width: 65%;
| contentcss = text-align: left; font-size: 100%; width: 75%;
| header = Set list
| content =
 "I"
 "Farewell"
 "Set Me Free"
 "Only One"
 "Missing You Like Crazy"
 "Can You Hear Me"
 "Holler" (Girls' Generation-TTS cover)
 "Eyes" (Girls' Generation-TTS cover)
 "Twinkle" (Girls' Generation-TTS cover)
 "Stress"
 "End of a Day"
 "I Love You" / "Love Me like You Do" (Ellie Goulding cover) / "Chandelier" (Sia cover) / "I'm in Love" (Narsha cover)
 "Merry-Go-Round" / "Lion Heart" (Girls' Generation cover)
 "Lion Heart" / "Top Secret (Shake the Tree)" (Girls' Generation cover)
 "Dancing Queen" / "Goodbye" (Girls' Generation cover)
Encore
"U R"
 "Gemini"
}}

Taeyeon, Butterfly Kiss

Taeyeon, Butterfly Kiss is the first headlining concert by Taeyeon, which was held at Olympic Hall from July 9 to July 10, 2016, and later at KBS Busan Hall from August 6 to August 7, 2016.
{{hidden
| headercss = background: #ccccff; font-size: 100%; width: 65%;
| contentcss = text-align: left; font-size: 100%; width: 75%;
| header = Set list
| content =
 "Up & Down"
 "Good Thing"
 "Fashion"
 "Night"
 "Rain"
 "Gemini"
 "Farewell"
 "If"
 "Can You Hear Me"
 "I Love You"
 "Time Spent Walking Through Memories" (Nell cover)
 "The Blue Night of Jeju Island"
 "Atlantis Princess" (BoA cover)
 "Why"
 "Hands on Me"
 "Starlight"
 "Secret"
 "Pray"
 "I"
Encore
"Stress"
 "Twinkle"(Girls' Generation-TTS cover)
 "Gee" (Girls' Generation cover)
 "U R"
}}

Taeyeon Special Live 'The Magic of Christmas Time'

{{hidden
| headercss = background: #ccccff; font-size: 100%; width: 65%;
| contentcss = text-align: left; font-size: 100%; width: 75%;
| header = Set list
| content =
 "The Magic of Christmas Time"
 "Christmas Without You"
 "11:11"
 "Eraser"
 "Night"
 "Shhh"
 "Rain"
 "Gemini"
 "Let It Snow"
 "Up & Down"
 "Good Thing"
 "Hands on Me"
 "Cover Up"
 "Why"
 "Winter Story" (Girls' Generation-TTS cover)
 "Have Yourself A Merry Little Christmas"
 "Grown Up Christmas List" (Amy Grant cover)
 "A Holly Jolly Christmas" (Burl Ives cover)
 "I'm All Ears"
Encore
 "Dear Santa"(Girls' Generation-TTS cover)
 "Candy Cane"
 "This Christmas"
 "Curtain Call"
}}

Showcases

Taeyeon -Japan Show Case Tour 2018–

Fan meetings

Joint tours and concerts

References

External links
 
 TAEYEON JAPAN OFFICIAL WEB – テヨン公式サイト 

Concerts
Lists of concert tours
Lists of concerts and performances
Lists of concert tours of South Korean artists
Lists of events in South Korea
South Korean music-related lists
K-pop concerts by artist